Leip is a surname. Notable people with the surname include

Ed Leip (1910–1983), American Baseball player
Hans Leip (1893–1983), German novelist, poet and playwright
Rudolf Leip (1890 –1947), German footballer

See also 
Dave Leip's Atlas of U.S. Presidential Elections, American political website